Jackie Wolcott Sanders is an American diplomat.

Early life 
Wolcott grew up in Martin, Ottawa County, Ohio. She graduated from Genoa Area High School in 1972, and went on to study at Bowling Green State University.

Career 
Wolcott has had a diplomatic career, working in national security and foreign policy.

Wolcott was appointed as United States Ambassador to the United Nations International Organizations in Vienna in October 2018, after being confirmed by the United States Senate on September 24, 2018. She completed her assignment and permanently departed her post at USUNVIE on Monday, January 18, 2021, two days before the inauguration of President Joe Biden.

References 

Living people
American women ambassadors
People from Ottawa County, Ohio
Representatives of the United States to the United Nations International Organizations in Vienna
Bowling Green State University alumni
Year of birth missing (living people)
21st-century American women
American women diplomats